García de Toledo Osorio or García Álvarez de Toledo Osorio, 6th Marquess of Villafranca, (25 April 1579 in Naples – 21 January 1649 in Madrid), Prince of Montalbano, 3rd Duke of Fernandina was a Spanish-Italian nobleman, military and a Grandee of Spain.

He was the son of Pedro de Toledo Osorio, 5th Marquess of Villafranca, and Elvira de Mendoza. 
As a child he was already Trece (thirteen) in the Order of Santiago, Prince of Montalbano and Duke of Fernandina.
  
He joined the navy in 1606 on a galley under the command of his father and in 1623 became Captain General of the Galleys of Spain. In this capacity, he participated in the successful Defense of Cadiz in 1625, and won a victory against France when he conquered the Lérins Islands (1635).

During the Catalan Revolt, in 1641 he won the important Battle of Tarragona (August 1641) against the French fleet under Henri de Sourdis, thus lifting the siege of the city.

He was Captain General of the Council of State and Council of War of King Philip IV of Spain, becoming one of his most trusted men. Count-Duke of Olivares deposed him from office and locked him up in the castle of Villaviciosa de Odon. After the fall of Olivares, Garcia was reinstated in all his functions and he was given 400,000 ducats as a compensation for having been punished unjustly.

Family
On 18 August 1609 he married  María de Mendoza, daughter of Ana de Mendoza y Enríquez de Cabrera, 6th Duchess of the Infantado. They had no children. He was succeeded by his nephew Fadrique Álvarez de Toledo, son of his brother Fadrique de Toledo, 1st Marquess of Valdueza.

Marquesses of Spain
Spanish politicians
17th-century Spanish military personnel
Spanish diplomats
1579 births
1649 deaths
Garcia
Dukes of Fernandina
Grandees of Spain
Military personnel of the Franco-Spanish War (1635–1659)